Communist Association of Norrköping (in Swedish: Norrköpings Kommunistiska Förening), was a communist group in Norrköping, Sweden.

In 1978 a pro-Albanian group based in Norrköping had broken away from the Sveriges Kommunistiska Parti (Communist Party of Sweden). This group formed NKF. In 1979 NKF merged with Stockholms Kommunistiska Enhetsgrupp to form Sveriges Kommunistiska Förbund - ml (Communist League of Sweden - ml), which later became Kommunistiska Partiet i Sverige (Communist Party in Sweden).

A series of expulsions from KPS 1983-1984 led to the refoundation of NKF.

In 1987 NKF started publishing Röd Gryning (Red Dawn).

Gradually NKF diverted from the pro-Albanian line and embraced Trotskyism.

In 1989 NKF changed its name to Marxist-Leninistiska Förbundet (Marxist-Leninist League).

In 1990 MLF dissolved itself and its cadres joined Arbetarlistan (Workers List). In 1992 a section of former MLF-members founded Förbundet för ett Revolutionärt Parti (League for a Revolutionary Party).

1978 establishments in Sweden
1990 disestablishments in Sweden
Communist organizations in Sweden
Defunct organizations based in Sweden
Organizations disestablished in 1990
Organizations established in 1978